Hassan Azarnia (حسن آذرنیا in Persian, born 27 June 1957) is an Iranian former footballer and coach. He is supervisor of Tractor.

References

1957 births
Living people
Sportspeople from Tabriz
Iranian football managers
Tractor S.C. players
Tractor S.C. managers
Iranian footballers
Association football defenders